The 2007 Island Games were the 12th edition of the Island Games, and were held in Rhodes, Greece, from June 30 to July 6, 2007.

Medal count

Sports 
The sports chosen for the games were:

See also
 Basketball at the 2007 Island Games
 Women's Football at the 2007 Island Games
 Men's Football at the 2007 Island Games

External links
 rhodes2007.info
 Island Games 2007

 
Island Games
Island Games
Island Games
Island Games
Multi-sport events in Greece
Sport in Rhodes
Events in Rhodes
June 2007 sports events in Europe
July 2007 sports events in Europe